Government First Grade College, Raichur   is a general degree College Located at Raichur, Karnataka, India.It was established in 2006.The college affiliated with Gulbarga University.This college offers different courses in arts, science and commerce.

Departments

Science
Physics
Chemistry
Mathematics
Computer Science

Arts and Commerce
Kannada
English
History
Political Science
Sociology
Economics
Business Administration
Commerce

Reference

External Link
https://gfgc.kar.nic.in/raichur/Contact-Us
https://raichur.nic.in/en/public-utility/govt-first-grade-college-raichur/

Educational institutions established in 2006
2006 establishments in Karnataka
Colleges affiliated to Raichur University
Universities and colleges in Raichur district
Raichur
 Education in Raichur district